Funny Pages is a 2022 American coming-of-age black comedy film written, directed, and edited by Owen Kline and produced by the Safdie brothers. It premiered at the 2022 Cannes Film Festival and was released in the United States on August 26, 2022, where it received positive reviews from critics.

The film tells the story of a 17-year-old cartoonist Robert, who leaves home after the death of his mentor to forge his own path. He moves to a basement apartment in Trenton, New Jersey and meets Wallace, a possibly unstable former cartoonist.

Plot
Robert Bleichner, a high school student and aspiring cartoonist, meets with his art teacher, Mr. Katano, at his school classroom. After Katano looks over Robert's portfolio, Katano asks Robert to make a nude figure drawing of him. Before completing the drawing, Robert's phone alarm goes off and he leaves for work. Outside, Katano attempts to talk with Robert. While trying to ensure the interaction did not make him uncomfortable, Katano is suddenly struck and killed by a car.

Later, Robert attempts to gather anything of sentimental value from his late mentor. After rummaging through Katano's classroom, Robert and his friend Miles break into Katano's apartment. As the police arrive at the scene, Miles escapes while Robert is apprehended. Robert enlists the help of Cheryl, a public defender, for his trial. He is not charged and is allowed to keep Katano's possessions. Shortly after being released, Robert meets with his parents, Lewis and Jennifer, at a diner. He proclaims that he wants to pursue a career in art and will not be finishing the school year, to his parents' disappointment.

Seeking independence, Robert leaves his parents' house and moves to Trenton, New Jersey, where he shares a dingy apartment with two older men, Barry and Steven. Robert takes a job working for Cheryl as a notetaker while continuing to work at a local comic book store. He attends a meeting with Cheryl and her client, Wallace, who is seeking legal counsel after an attempted assault on a pharmacist. While taking notes, Robert learns that Wallace used to work for Image Comics as an assistant colorist.

The next day, Robert attempts several times to connect with Wallace over his comic book career but is met with Wallace's erratic and volatile behavior. Before driving home, Robert offers Wallace a ride home, which he hastily accepts. During the ride, Wallace coerces Robert to drive to the pharmacy where he was charged with assault. Wallace instructs Robert to provoke the pharmacist in an attempt to get him fired, believing it will help with his case. Robert reluctantly agrees in order to earn Wallace's approval. In an unsuccessful attempt to gather incriminating evidence, Robert throws a rubber horse at the pharmacist and flees the scene.

Robert drops off a disgruntled Wallace. Desperate for professional guidance, Robert offers to pay Wallace for a drawing lesson. Wallace agrees when Robert suggests they could meet at his parents' house in Princeton, New Jersey. Later that night, Robert moves back home after walking in on Barry and Steven masturbating to Katano's adult comics at their apartment.

When Wallace arrives the next morning, Lewis and Jennifer are immediately suspicious of him. An increasingly uncomfortable Wallace locks himself in the bathroom and smashes a window in frustration. Robert takes Wallace up to his room and pays him with the money he stole from his mother's purse. Miles arrives unannounced and tries to show Wallace his work. During the lesson, Wallace finds Robert's comic parodying him and his misadventures. In a fit of rage, Wallace lambasts the boys and attempts to take Miles' comic from his hands.

In the ensuing scuffle, Miles is accidentally stabbed in the head with a pen. Wallace attempts to flee the house by stealing Robert's car, but he crashes it into the garage. Robert chases Wallace on foot, then Wallace beats up Robert and tells him to leave him alone. A broken and bruised Robert stumbles to the closed comic book store. He sits at the counter and contemplates what just happened.

Cast

Production
The character of Robert first appeared in 2011 in the comic book Whippers & Snappers in a story drawn by Kline called "Robert in the Boiler Room."

The film began shooting in 2017 with the working title Two Against Nature and, after several delays and re-writes, filming was completed in December 2021.

Release
The film premiered at the 2022 Cannes Film Festival in the Directors' Fortnight on May 24, 2022, where it received a three-minute standing ovation. It premiered in the US at an outdoor screening at the Brooklyn Army Terminal on August 20, 2022, before being released theatrically on August 26th.

Critical response

References

External links
 

2022 black comedy films
2022 independent films
2020s American films
2020s coming-of-age comedy films
2020s English-language films
A24 (company) films
American black comedy films
American coming-of-age comedy films
American independent films
Films about comics
Films about fictional painters
Films set in New Jersey